Steven Manning is a former Scotland U21 international rugby union player who played on the Wing for Glasgow Warriors and Ayr.

Rugby Union career

Amateur career

A product of Belmont Academy in Ayr, Manning was selected by the Glasgow District U19 side. He played for the Ayrshire academy in the Scottish Schools Cup in 2000.

Manning played for Ayr. He won young player of the year for season 2002-03. He played for Ayr in the British and Irish Cup from 2009 to 2011.

Professional career

In season 2004-05 Manning made the Warriors squad but only made the bench in the Warriors match away to Munster Rugby on 21 February 2005.

Manning played for Glasgow Warriors in 2005-06 season. He came on from the bench in the Warriors August match against Edinburgh Rugby that season.

International career

Manning was capped at Scotland U21 level.

References

External links
Ayr one step closer to making history
Scotland U21 v Ireland U21, February 2005

Living people
Glasgow Warriors players
Ayr RFC players
Alumni of the University of Edinburgh
Place of birth missing (living people)
Year of birth missing (living people)